Cedric Simmons (born January 3, 1986) is an American-born Bulgarian professional basketball player for SeaHorses Mikawa in the Japanese B.League. He was born in the United States, but also holds Bulgarian citizenship, and has played for the senior men's Bulgarian national basketball team. A  power forward-center, Simmons was selected by the New Orleans Hornets, in the first round (15th overall pick) of the 2006 NBA draft.

College career
Simmons played college basketball at North Carolina State University with the NC State Wolfpack. As a sophomore, he averaged 11.8 points, 6.3 rebounds, 1.7 assists, and 2.5 blocks per game.

Professional career
Simmons was selected with the 15th pick in the 2006 NBA draft by the New Orleans Hornets. On July 5, 2006, he signed with the Hornets. On September 29, 2007, he was traded to the Cleveland Cavaliers, in exchange for guard David Wesley. On January 2, 2008, he was assigned to the Rio Grande Valley Vipers of the NBA D-League. He was recalled by Cleveland on January 11, 2008. On February 21, 2008, he was traded to the Chicago Bulls, in a three-team trade, along with Drew Gooden, Larry Hughes, and Shannon Brown, in exchange for Ben Wallace and Joe Smith. On March 15, 2008, he was assigned to the Iowa Energy of the D-League. On April 1, 2008, he was recalled by the Bulls. On February 18, 2009, he was traded to the Sacramento Kings, along with Drew Gooden and Andrés Nocioni, for Brad Miller and John Salmons.

On December 4, 2009, he was signed by the Idaho Stampede of the NBA D-League. In late January 2010, he left the Stampede and signed with the Dongguan Leopards of China for the rest of the 2009–10 CBA season. After the end of the Chinese season, on April 2, 2010, he signed with Kavala of the Greek League for the rest of the season. In August 2011, he signed with Estudiantes of the Spanish Liga ACB for the 2011–12 season.

On August 17, 2012, Simmons signed with New Basket Brindisi of the Italian Serie A for the 2012–13 season. On July 1, 2013, he signed a three-year deal with the Greek club Olympiacos. On November 4, 2014, he parted ways with Olympiacos. Four days later, he signed with his former team New Basket Brindisi. After suffering a season-ending knee injury, he was replaced in the line-up by Micheal Eric on December 13, 2014.

On August 8, 2015, he signed with Royal Halı Gaziantep of the Turkish Basketball League. However, later that month he parted ways with Gaziantep before appearing in a game for them.

On January 28, 2016, he signed a two-week contract with Maccabi Tel Aviv. Following the expiration of his contract, he parted ways with Maccabi on February 12. Two days later, he signed with Baloncesto Sevilla for the rest of the season. However, after failing to pass physicals his contract with the Spanish team was voided.

On August 19, 2016, Simmons joined Budućnost VOLI for a tryout period. However, he did not signed a contract. On November 27, 2016, he signed with Estonian club BC Kalev/Cramo. Two days later, he made his debut for Kalev/Cramo in a 102–69 win over G4S Noorteliiga, recording 6 points in 14 minutes. On August 1, 2017, he re-signed with Kalev/Cramo for one more season.

National team career
Simmons has been a member of the senior men's Bulgarian national basketball team. He played at the FIBA EuroBasket 2013 qualification tournament, where he averaged 10.4 points, 8.3 rebounds, and 1.3 blocks per game.

Personal life
On December 12, 2007, Simmons's girlfriend, Sabrina Acevedo, gave birth to the couple's son at Hillcrest Hospital in Mayfield Heights, Ohio.

NBA career statistics

Regular season 

|-
| align="left" | 
| align="left" | New Orleans/Oklahoma City
| 43 || 4 || 12.4 || .417 || .000 || .485 || 2.5 || .3 || .2 || .5 || 2.9
|-
| align="left" | 
| align="left" | Cleveland
| 7 || 0 || 9.7 || .333 || .000 || .000 || 2.1 || .0 || .3 || .7 || .6
|-
| align="left" | 
| align="left" | Chicago
| 7 || 0 || 2.7 || .250 || .000 || .000 || .4 || .0 || .0 || .0 || .6
|-
| align="left" | 
| align="left" | Chicago
| 11 || 0 || 5.5 || .524 || .000 || .429 || 1.1 || .2 || .1 || .4 || 2.5
|-
| align="left" | 
| align="left" | Sacramento
| 7 || 0 || 3.3 || .000 || .000 || .500 || .6 || .0 || .0 || .0 || .1
|-
| align="center" colspan=2 | Career
| 75 || 4 || 9.4 || .409 || .000 || .390 || 1.9 || .2 || .1 || .4 || 2.2

References

External links
NBA.com Profile 

Euroleague.net profile
FIBA Europe profile
Eurobasket.com profile
FIBA.com profile
Italian League profile 
Spanish League profile 

1986 births
Living people
African-American basketball players
American expatriate basketball people in China
American expatriate basketball people in Estonia
American expatriate basketball people in Greece
American expatriate basketball people in Israel
American expatriate basketball people in Italy
American expatriate basketball people in Japan
American expatriate basketball people in Spain
American men's basketball players
Basketball players from North Carolina
BC Kalev/Cramo players
Bulgarian men's basketball players
Bulgarian people of American descent
CB Estudiantes players
Centers (basketball)
Chicago Bulls players
Cleveland Cavaliers players
Greek Basket League players
Idaho Stampede players
Iowa Energy players
Kavala B.C. players
Liga ACB players
Maccabi Tel Aviv B.C. players
NC State Wolfpack men's basketball players
New Basket Brindisi players
New Orleans Hornets draft picks
New Orleans Hornets players
Olympiacos B.C. players
Parade High School All-Americans (boys' basketball)
People from Brunswick County, North Carolina
Power forwards (basketball)
Rio Grande Valley Vipers players
Sacramento Kings players
San-en NeoPhoenix players
Shenzhen Leopards players
Small forwards
Korvpalli Meistriliiga players